Farida Akhtar Poppy, known by her stage name Babita, is a Bangladeshi film actress. She is a popular actress in Bangladeshi films of the 1970s. She is best known for her performance in Satyajit Ray's Distant Thunder, a novel adaptation about the Bengal famine of 1943, which won the Golden Bear prize at the 23rd Berlin International Film Festival in 1973. She was active in the 1970s through 1990s as an actress in Bangladeshi films. Babita acted in more than 350 films. After winning the National Film Award in 1975, she won three consecutive best actress prizes. She won Best Actor in 1986, Best Producer in 1997 and Best Supporting Actress Award twice in 2002 and 2012. In addition, she was awarded the lifetime achievement award of the National Film Award in the year 2016.

Early life 
Babita was born to a family that had its origins in the west-Bangladeshi district of Jessore, Bangladesh. Her father Nizamuddin Ataub was a government officer and mother Jahan Ara Begum was a doctor. They were in Bagerhat due to their father's job. Her nickname is Poppy. She has three sisters and three brothers. Babita's mother studied in Lady Brabourne College in Calcutta. In an interview with the Independent newspaper in 2004, Babita says that it was Afzal Chowdhury who suggested the screen name Babita for her. In another interview with the Daily Star in 2005, she mentions that Zahir Raihan originally casts her for the movie Shongshaar. A different version of the story is that she adopted the name after appearing in Ehtesham's movie Pitch Dhala Path.

Babita's brother-in-law Zahir Raihan first cast her for his movie Jaltey Suraj Ka Nichey. The film was not completed in the end but she found a break-through into the Dhaka film industry. Her first released feature was Shesh Porjonto. Among the three sisters and three brothers are elder sister Shuchanda who is a film actress, elder brother Shaheedul Islam is an Electrical Engineer, currently living in Australia, another brother Iqbal Islam is a Pilot officer, younger sister Champa is a film actress and younger brother Ferdous Islam is currently living in the United States.

Education 
Babita studied in her early days at Dawood Public School in Jessore. During her studies there, due to her sister's arrival in the movie, she came to Dhaka with her family. Later she studied in Gloria School. She earned proficiency in English, including some foreign languages. She refined herself to the level of an ideal artist.

Personal life
Babita's husband died when their son was three years old. Her two sisters Shuchanda and Champa are film actresses.

Career

Actress 
Babita's notable work includes Shukhe Thako, Taka Anna Pai, Shorolipi, Manusher Mon, Pich Dhala Path, Noyon Moni, Jonmo Theke Jolchi and Anarkoli. Her acting gained the attention of the Indian director Satyajit Ray. In 1973, Ray cast Babita in Ashani Sanket ("Distant Thunder"), his film about the Bengal famine of 1943. Babita appeared in the lead role of Ananga, the demure wife of the village doctor Gangacharan, who was played by long-time Ray favorite Soumitra Chatterjee.

She acted in number of joint venture movie projects in her career, namely: a Canada  Bollywood-Bangladesh joint production Movie Door Desh in 1983 (Gehri Chot - Urf: Durdesh in Hindi) opposite Nadeem Baig (actor) and also Pakistan-Bangladesh joint venture film Miss Lanka (Nadaani in Urdu) in 1985. Ashani Sanket won the Golden Bear prize at the 1973 Berlin Film Festival. Babita's performance was central to the film.

Babita also acted in Arunodoyer Agnishakkhi (1972) by Subhash Dutta, Quiet Flows the river Meghna (1973) by Alamgir Kabir, Golapi Ekhon Trainey (1978) by Amjad Hossain, Dahan (1986) by Sheikh Niamat Ali, and Dipu Number Two (1996) by Morshedul Islam.

Babita's male co-actors were Razzak, Faruk, Zafar Iqbal, Bulbul Ahmed, and Sohel Rana.

1968–1974 
Babita made her debut as a child actor in the Songsar film of Zahir Raihan starring elder sister Shuchanda. In this movie she plays the daughter of Razzaq and Shuchanda. Her primary name in the film was "Subarna". She acted in a television drama called "Kalam" at that time. Her name became "Babita" when she appeared in Zaheer Raihan's movie "Jalte Suraj Ki Niche". In the role of the first heroine in 1969, she starred in the film. The film was released on 14 August 1969 and on that day her mother died. Throughout the 70's, she established herself as one of the best actresses of the decade.

Since 2000

In 2002, Babita won a National Film Award for Best Supporting Actress for her role in Hason Raja, Chashi Nazrul Islam's biopic of the Bengali folk-poet. She has also formed her own film-production company and has expressed an interest in directing in the future.

Babita has campaigned actively on behalf of various social causes in Bangladesh. Notable among the causes she has supported the campaign against throwing acid on women; the national immunization drive for children; and a support group for children who suffer from leukemia. Starting in 2011, Babita began working with Distressed Children & Infants International as a goodwill ambassador.

Producer 
After the commercial success of Teen Kannya (1985), a movie produced by Babita's elder sister Shuchanda, Babita became interested in producing movies and hence launched a movie production house named "Babita Movies." Some of Babita's produced movies include Ful Shojja, Agomon, Lady Smuggler (a Bangladesh-Pakistan-Nepal joint venture movie), Lottery and Poka Makorer Ghor Bosoti (a Bangladesh Government sponsored movie).

Filmography

Awards
Babita won three consecutive National Film Awards for three consecutive years. She received the Best Actress Award from the Bangla Film Journalist Association for her performance in Satyajit Ray's Distant Thunder film. Besides, she has received numerous awards, both public and private. That is why she was called a 'prize daughter'. She participated in the International Film Festival for the most number of Bangladeshi delegates.

References

External links
 

Living people
1953 births
People from Jessore District
Bangladeshi film actresses
Actresses in Bengali cinema
Actresses in Hindi cinema
Bangladeshi expatriate actresses in India
Best Actress National Film Awards (Bangladesh) winners
Meril-Prothom Alo Lifetime Achievement Award winners
Best Actress Bachsas Award winners
Best Supporting Actress Bachsas Award winners
National Film Award (Bangladesh) for Lifetime Achievement recipients
Best Supporting Actress National Film Award (Bangladesh) winners
20th-century Bangladeshi actresses
21st-century Bangladeshi actresses